"Foolish Pride" is a single from singer/songwriter Daryl Hall (part of pop-rock duo Hall & Oates). It was the second single release from his second solo album, Three Hearts in the Happy Ending Machine.

The song reached number 33 on the U.S. Billboard Hot 100 and number 29 on the U.S. Cash Box Top 100.  On the Adult Contemporary chart, "Foolish Pride" reached number 21.

Chart performance

References

External links 
 

1986 songs
1986 singles
Daryl Hall songs
Songs written by Daryl Hall
RCA Records singles